Senjou no Hana is the debut album by J-Rock artist AYA. The English title of the album is A Flower in the Battlefield.

Matt Cameron of Soundgarden and Pearl Jam fame plays drums on the album. It also features contributions from several other American musicians: John McBain (bass, 6 tracks), Kim Thayil (guitar, 5 tracks), Glenn Slater (keyboards, 5 tracks) and Nirvana's Krist Novoselic (bass, 1 track).

Some songs are sung entirely in English, some entirely in Japanese, and some a mixture.

The album was produced by Adam Kasper.

Track listing
 "Prisoner"
 "HANDS"
 "Sentaku no Asa" (The Morning I Chose My Way)
 "Saboten no Uta" (Cactus Song)
 "May Day"
 "RABBI DOLL"
 "ANGERICA"
 "Jona no Nikki -Home Demo Version-" (Jona's Diary)
 "KING OF PAIN"
 "Crazy Mermaid"
 "Fukai Ai" (Deep Love)

Singles
 HANDS
 Crazy Mermaid
 Sentaku no Asa

2002 albums